"Ocean" is a song by Sebadoh from their 1996 album Harmacy.  It was released as a Promo CD, a CD Single and 7" vinyl record.

A music video was made for the song. It was directed by Laura Borealis (Laura Hyde Crapo).

The song peaked at number 23 on the US Modern Rock chart, and reached 146 on the UK Singles chart.

Track listing 
UK 7" Single  (RUG50)
 "Ocean (Tim O'Heir's Ocean Way remix)"
 "Worst Thing (Osterville version)"

UK/GE CD Single  	(RUG50CD)
 "Ocean (Tim O'Heir's Ocean Way remix)"
 "Worst Thing (Osterville version)"
 "Third Generation Deadline"
 "Portrait of the Dead Artist on the Phone"

US Promo Single (SUBPROCD 53)
 "Ocean (Tim O'Heir's Ocean Way remix)"

Sebadoh songs
1996 singles
Sub Pop singles
Songs written by Lou Barlow
1996 songs